IPE Global Limited is an Indian international development consulting group known for providing technical assistance and solutions for development and sustainable growth in developing countries.

History
IPE Global was established in 1998 by a group of London School of Economics and Political Science (LSE) alumni with the view of providing expertise for development reforms. The company is ISO 9001:2015 certified with its headquarters located in New Delhi, India. It has seven international offices in UK, Kenya, Ethiopia, Myanmar, Philippines, Nepal and Bangladesh.

In 2011, UK based leading private equity fund; Henderson Group invested in IPE Global with the view of enhancing the developmental goals of the group. In 2014, IPE Global became the first development sector consulting firm from India to acquire a leading UK consulting firm – Triple Line consulting which expanded the group’s global footprints in over 100 countries with offices across Africa, Asia and Europe.

Partnerships 
The company partners with multilateral and bilateral agencies; governments, corporate and Nonprofit organizations in anchoring development initiatives for addressing complex socio-economic issues.

Services
IPE Global works towards improving economic well-being, building local capacities, and addressing challenges of urbanization.

 The group has been contributing towards rapid transformation in developing countries.

COVID-19 control initiatives 
Since the outbreak of COVID-19 in 2020, IPE Global has been engaging in various initiatives and talks geared towards controlling the pandemic across the Indian nation. In 2021, IPE Global and London School of Economics Alumni Delhi with MeraDoc, a pro-bono initiative that connects doctors with COVID-19 patients organized  a webinar on ''Best practices and strategies for handling the COVID-19 pandemic" in Delhi.

References

Service companies of India
Companies established in 1998